This is a list of members of the Grand Ducal Family of Luxembourg who bear or have borne the title "Prince of Luxembourg". The title is typically born by sons and some male line grandsons of the grand dukes and grand duchesses of Luxembourg.

Princes of Luxembourg are also princes of Nassau, and male line descendants of Prince Félix are princes of Bourbon-Parma.

Traditionally, princes bore the style of Grand Ducal Highness, but since Grand Duchess Charlotte's marriage to Prince Félix of Bourbon-Parma, all of their male line descendants have been styled as Royal Highness.

Princes of Luxembourg

See also
 Monarchy of Luxembourg
 List of princesses of Luxembourg

References

Luxembourgish monarchy
Princes
House of Luxembourg-Nassau
House of Nassau
House of Bourbon